The Hamburg tramway network once formed part of the public transport system in the city and federal state of Hamburg, Germany. Opened in 1866, the network lasted until 1978.

Overview
Hamburg's first tram service was with horsecars, beginning on 16 August 1866.  Operation of steam-powered trams began on 13 May 1878 and continued until 1897, while horsecar service continued on some lines (with the last one surviving until 1922).

Electric tram service was introduced on 5 March 1894 and continued until 1978, with the system closing on 1 October 1978.

Proposed 21st century system
A similar style of transport, light rail, was to have been provided by the Hamburg Stadtbahn project, but following the Hamburg state election, 2011, the newly elected First Mayor of Hamburg, Olaf Scholz, announced that that project would not be going ahead.

See also
List of town tramway systems in Germany
Trams in Germany
Hamburg U-Bahn
Hamburg S-Bahn
Transport in Hamburg

References

Citations

Further reading

External links

Hamburg
Tram
Hamburg